USS Champlin (DD-104) was a  built for the United States Navy during World War I.

Description
The Wickes class was an improved and faster version of the preceding . Two different designs were prepared to the same specification that mainly differed in the turbines and boilers used. The ships built to the Bethlehem Steel design, built in the Fore River and Union Iron Works shipyards, mostly used Yarrow boilers that deteriorated badly during service and were mostly scrapped during the 1930s. They had a crew of 6 officers and 108 enlisted men.

Performance differed radically between the ships of the class, often due to poor workmanship. The Wickes class was powered by two steam turbines, each driving one propeller shaft, using steam provided by four water-tube boilers.

The ships were armed with four 4-inch (102 mm) guns in single mounts and were fitted with two  1-pounder guns for anti-aircraft defense. Their primary weapon, though, was their torpedo battery of a dozen 21 inch (533 mm) torpedo tubes in four triple mounts. In many ships a shortage of 1-pounders caused them to be replaced by 3-inch (76 mm) anti-aircraft (AA) guns. They also carried a pair of depth charge rails. A "Y-gun" depth charge thrower was added to many ships.

Construction and career
Champlin, named in honor of Stephen Champlin, was launched 7 April 1918 by Union Iron Works, San Francisco, California; sponsored by Miss G. H. Rolph; and commissioned 11 November 1918, Lieutenant Commander F. M. Knox in command.

Champlin arrived at Newport, Rhode Island, 12 December 1918 for duty with the Atlantic Fleet. After training operations in the Caribbean, she cleared New York City 19 November 1919 for San Diego, California. Arriving 24 December 1919, she went into reserve with the Pacific Fleet the same day, and cruised on training assignments with a reduced complement until decommissioned 7 June 1922. Laid up at San Diego until her assignment for use in experiments on 19 May 1933, Champlin was sunk in tests 12 August 1936.

See also
See USS Champlin for other ships of the same name.

Notes

References

External links
 NavSource Photos

 

Champlin (DD-104)
Ships built in San Francisco
1918 ships
Maritime incidents in 1936
Ships sunk as targets
Shipwrecks of the California coast